Mitchell is a city in Mitchell County, Iowa, United States. The population was 124 at the time of the 2020 census.

History
Mitchell was founded in 1854. Mitchell is the name of a friend of one of the founders, C. C. Prime.

Geography
Mitchell is located at  (43.321129, -92.870348).

Demographics

2010 census
As of the census of 2010, there were 138 people, 62 households, and 41 families living in the city. The racial makeup of the city was 100.0% White.

There were 62 households, of which 22.6% had children under the age of 18 living with them, 58.1% were married couples living together, 4.8% had a female householder with no husband present, 3.2% had a male householder with no wife present, and 33.9% were non-families. 30.6% of all households were made up of individuals, and 12.9% had someone living alone who was 65 years of age or older. The average household size was 2.23 and the average family size was 2.71.

The median age in the city was 48.3 years. 21% of residents were under the age of 18; 3.6% were between the ages of 18 and 24; 21% were from 25 to 44; 31.2% were from 45 to 64; and 23.2% were 65 years of age or older. The gender makeup of the city was 54.3% male and 45.7% female.

2000 census
As of the census of 2000, there were 155 people, 68 households, and 42 families living in the city. The racial makeup of the city was 100.00% White. Hispanic or Latino of any race were 1.94% of the population.

There were 68 households, out of which 23.5% had children under the age of 18 living with them, 48.5% were married couples living together, 8.8% had a female householder with no husband present, and 38.2% were non-families. 33.8% of all households were made up of individuals, and 11.8% had someone living alone who was 65 years of age or older. The average household size was 2.28 and the average family size was 2.93.

In the city, the population was spread out, with 20.6% under the age of 18, 9.0% from 18 to 24, 25.8% from 25 to 44, 26.5% from 45 to 64, and 18.1% who were 65 years of age or older. The median age was 43 years. For every 100 females, there were 121.4 males. For every 100 females age 18 and over, there were 127.8 males.

The median income for a household in the city was $27,000, and the median income for a family was $33,750. Males had a median income of $24,375 versus $20,000 for females. The per capita income for the city was $15,768. About 7.7% of families and 12.6% of the population were below the poverty line, including 26.7% of those under the age of eighteen and 5.9% of those 65 or over.

Education
It is within the Osage Community School District.

Notable people
Clinton Clauson, 66th governor of Maine from January 1959 to December 1959
Henry Haven Windsor, founder of Popular Mechanics magazine
Oran Faville, first County Judge of Mitchell County County, first lieutenant governor of Iowa, last secretary of Board of Education, and first superintendent of Public Instruction of Iowa

References

Cities in Iowa
Cities in Mitchell County, Iowa